Nanticoke Hundred is a hundred in Sussex County, Delaware, United States. Nanticoke Hundred was formed in 1775 from Somerset County, Maryland.

References

External links
 Nanticoke Post No. 6 

Hundreds in Sussex County, Delaware
1775 establishments in Delaware